Surrey Docks North was an authorised underground railway station planned by London Underground but never built. It was to be located in Rotherhithe and named after the Surrey Commercial Docks in the London Borough of Southwark, in east London as a station on an unbuilt extension of the Jubilee line to Woolwich Arsenal.

Plan
Plans for a new underground line connecting north-west and south-east London via the West End and the City of London were first considered in the 1930s. They were developed during the 1950s and 1960s until a plan for the Fleet line established a route to Lewisham in 1965 with permission to build the first phase to Charing Cross granted in 1969 with the second and third phases approved in 1971 and 1972.

Phase 1 opened as the Jubilee line in 1979, but uncertainty as to the appropriate eastern destination of the line and shortage of funds meant that the remaining works were never begun. An alternative route for Phase 3 was planned and approved in 1980 that followed a more northern alignment to Woolwich Arsenal and included Surrey Docks North station in place of an interchange with the East London line at Surrey Docks (now Surrey Quays) planned in the original Phase 3 route. It would have been between Wapping and Millwall.

Although preparatory works were carried out for Phase 2, neither it nor either of the Phase 3 routes were constructed. When, in the 1990s, the Jubilee line extension to Stratford was constructed, it followed a route south of the River Thames.

See also
Canada Water station - a nearby Jubilee line and East London line interchange station opened in 1999

References

Bibliography

 

Unbuilt London Underground stations
Proposed London Underground stations
Tube stations in the London Borough of Southwark